Jagadenahalli is a village in Malur Taluk, Kolar district, Karnataka, India. The total population of Jagadenahalli is 671 with 340 male and 331 female.

Lord Thimmaraya swammy along with goddess Sridevi and Bhudevi temple is located in Jagadenahalli. Lord Venkateswara is worshiped in the name of Thimmaraya swammy. 

Villages in Kolar district